Kavinia is a genus of fungi in the Lentariaceae family. The genus contains five species, and has a largely European distribution.

The genus name of Kavinia is in honour of Karel Kavina (1890–1948) was a Czech botanist.

The genus was circumscribed by Albert Pilát in Stud. Bot. Cech. vol.1 on page 3 in 1938.

References

Gomphales